The Zurich Renegades are an American football team from Zürich, Switzerland. The club, formed in 1983, is the oldest still existing American football club in Switzerland. With seven Swiss Bowl victories the Renegades have the second most after the Calanda Broncos.

History
Formed in November 1983, the club took part in the inaugural Swiss Bowl three years later, in 1986, where it lost to Lugano Seagulls. The two clubs met again in the 1987 Swiss Bowl and this time Zurich kept the upper hand and defended its title in 1988, now against the Bienna Jets. After this, the club briefly dropped out of the Nationalliga A, the highest league of American football in Switzerland. The club returned to the Nationalliga in 1990 but it took another decade for the Renegades to reach another Swiss Bowl.

From 2000 onwards the Renegades played in eight of the next ten Swiss Bowl, winning five of those and losing three. National titles were won in 2001 against the Basel Gladiators, in 2002 against the Seaside Vipers St. Gallen, in 2004 and 2005 against the Winterthur Warriors and in 2008 against the Calanda Broncos. The club's last appearance in the Swiss Bowl to date came in 2009 when it lost 23–35 to the Broncos. From 2010 to 2015 the club has played in the Nationalliga A without quite making it to the national championship game again. The 2016 season saw the club come last in the league without a win all season and lose the relegation play-off against Nationalliga B champions Geneva Seahawks as well.

Thereafter, the rebuild started. Two new mexican Coaches were acquired, Fabian Muñoz as head coach and offensive coordinator and Alonso Espinosa as defensive coordinator. In the first season in the NLB, the team managed to achieve only three victories out of 8 games played with the new coaching staff in the 2017 season. One year later, the mission to get back to NLA started and 9 regular season wins showed the potential of the team and led them to the relegation Game against the Luzern Lions. However, the Renegades were narrowly defeated by the team from Central Switzerland.

In 2019, the Zurich Renegades had a perfect season with 10 out of 10 regular season wins and were once again playing against the Luzern Lions in the relegation game for the right to be promoted back to the NLA. This time the team from Zurich was victorious, defeating Lucerne 38–27 in Utogrund Stadium in front of over 1000 visitors, paving the way to move back up to NLA the  highest American Football league in Switzerland.

Honours
 Swiss Bowl
 Champions: (7) 1987, 1988, 2001, 2002, 2004, 2005, 2008
 Runners-up: (4) 1986, 2000, 2006, 2009

Recent seasons
Recent seasons of the club:

 SF = Semi Finals
 SB = Swiss Bowl
 PR = Promotion Round
 RR = Relegation Round

References

External links
 Official website  
 Football History  Historic American football tables from Germany and Europe

American football teams in Switzerland
American football teams established in 1983
1983 establishments in Switzerland
Sport in Zürich